Georges Nguyen Van Loc (2 April 1933 – 7 December 2008) was a French policeman, actor, and author.

Van Loc worked as a policeman, police inspector and commissioner in his native Marseille for many years. He later wrote an autobiography about his career as a police officer and played himself in a television series based on his life. He created the first GIPN. He was nicknamed "le Chinois" ("the Chinese") despite his Vietnamese descent.

Career
Of Vietnamese descent , Georges Nguyen Van Loc was born in the Panier district in Marseille, in a working class environment. He spent his childhood in Marseille and he got his contacts with the future godfathers of the Marseille milieu, in particular Gaëtan Zampa aka Tany Zampa .

Georges Nguyen Van Loc began his career in the police force in Algeria, at CRS 203 unit in Oran (created February 28, 1957), as a  Peace Officer. He had already been in this country during his military service.

Dubbed the "Chinese", he created in 1972 the first National Police Intervention Groups (GIPN) unit. Setup first in Marseilles, its purpose is to fight against organized crime or terrorism and manage crisis situations: madmen, hostages, escorts or riots. An anecdote among many recounts that, at the beginning of the 1980s, he and his team dressed up as nurses to arrest a drug addict who was holding his mother hostage, in a building in Marseille. The divisional commissioner Van Loc commanded the GIPN of Marseille for more than fifteen years and successfully handled the most difficult situations. One of his pride was not to have on his account any death on duty of the police officers in his teams. He retired in 1989.

After writing autobiographical novels, from volume 1 Le Chinois in 1989 to volume 6 in 2006, he played his own character in the television series Van Loc, of which he was the main character from 1992 to 1998.

It was parodied by the Robins des Bois in a recurring sketch where Pierre-François Martin-Laval plays Van Loc during the filming of the TV series.

Death
Van Loc died of a heart attack in Cannes, France on 7 December 2008 at 0:45, aged 75. He is buried in Saint-Pierre cemetery in Marseille (18 square western center 1 st  rank 23).

Distinctions

 Knight of the Legion of Honor
     Knight of the Ordre national du Mérite
     Cross of Military Valor with Citation to the Order of the Division
     Combatant's Cross
     Commemorative medal for security operations and maintenance of order in Algeria
     Gold medal for feats of courage and dedication from the Ministry of the Interior
     Medal of Honor of the National Police for exceptional circumstances
     Medal of the Wounded
     Medal of the National Assembly
     Senate medal

Works authored
Le Chinois Tome 1: Le Chinois, 1989 Presses de la Cité,
Triangle d'or, 1992 Presses de la Cité,
Le Chinois: La peau d'un caïd, 1994 Presses de la Cité, 
Affaires criminelles, 1995 Presses de la Cité,
Le Chinois: Les marchands de venin, 1995 Presses de la Cité,
Le troisième juge, 1996 Presses de la Cité,
Meurtres au soleil, 1996 Presses de la Cité,
Le Chinois: Les aviseurs, 1997 Presses de la Cité,
Vengeance transversale, 2002 Ramsay,
Van Loc, 2004 Autres Temps,
Les Marchands de venin, 2004 Autres Temps,
La peau d'un caïd, 2004 Autres Temps,
Paroles d'homme, 2005 Autres Temps, 
Le Chinois Tome 6: Le Crépuscule des voyous, 2006 Autres Temps,

Filmography
 Van Loc (9 episodes), in which he plays his own role: 
     30 January 1992 : Van Loc, le flic de Marseille   
 25 March 1993 : La Grenade
     2 December 1993 : La Vengeance
     21 November 1994 : L'Affaire Da Costa
     1995 : Le Grand Casse
     14 December 1995 : Victoire aux poings
     8 January 1997 : Ennemis d'enfance
     16 January 1997 : Pour l'amour de Marie
     8 January 1998 : La Relève

References

External links

1933 births
2008 deaths
French police officers
French male television actors
French people of Vietnamese descent
Male actors from Marseille
Writers of Vietnamese descent
Knights of the Ordre national du Mérite
French male writers
20th-century French male writers